Lee Keng Pan (born 28 February 1990) is a Macanese international footballer who plays as a forward for Benfica de Macau and the Macau national football team.

International career
Lee made his international debut for Macau in 2009, a 2010 East Asian Football Championship game against the Northern Mariana Islands; playing 58 minutes before being substituted for Loi Wai Hong. After three friendly appearances in 2010, and 5 years away from the squad, Lee returned in 2015 for a friendly loss to Hong Kong.

Career statistics

Club

Notes

International

References

External links
 

1990 births
Living people
Macau footballers
Macau international footballers
Association football forwards
G.D. Lam Pak players
Windsor Arch Ka I players
Sporting Clube de Macau players
S.L. Benfica de Macau players
Liga de Elite players